Both Ways Open Jaws is the second album by French-Finnish indie rock duo The Dø, released on 9 March 2011 in France and in late October 2011 and mid-November 2011 worldwide.

Critical reception 

Metacritic, a review-aggregating website, gives the album a combined rating of 75 out of 100 from 16 reviews, which is classified as a "generally favorable" reception. Only two of those were not in the "positive" range (70 or above), both judged at 40 ("mixed"). Mezzic gave the album 8.5 out of 10, saying "The follow-up to their debut A Mouthful has the band dive further into their freak-pop explorations, still striving to produce better music" and that "their sustainable collaboration has carried itself over to a promising sophomore album". BBC Music called the album "Truly impressive".

Charts

Track listing 
All songs written by Olivia Bouyssou Merilahti and Dan Levy.
 "Dust It Off" – 3:42
 "Gonna Be Sick!" – 4:09
 "The Wicked & the Blind" – 5:08
 "Too Insistent" – 3:29
 "Bohemian Dances" – 4:23
 "Smash Them All (Night Visitors)" – 5:12
 "Leo Leo" – 3:30
 "B.W.O.J" – 1:43
 "Slippery Slope" – 2:41
 "The Calendar" – 4:03
 "Was It a Dream?" – 3:05
 "Quake, Mountain, Quake" – 2:10
 "Moon Mermaids" – 3:02

Bonus tracks
 "Open C" – 1:15
 "No Clue" – 8:01

References

External links
 Official website

2011 albums
The Dø albums